Matt Ratana (3 May 1966 – 25 September 2020) was a New Zealand-born British police sergeant who was shot dead inside a police custody facility in London on 25 September 2020. He was nearing retirement having served in the Metropolitan Police for nearly 30 years when he became the first police officer to be fatally shot in the UK since the murders of Nicola Hughes and Fiona Bone in 2012.

Background
Ratana was born in the Hawke's Bay Region of New Zealand and was of Māori descent. Born Matiu Ratana, he was known as Matt to his family and colleagues. He moved to England in 1989, working for the Metropolitan Police for nearly 30 years. Ratana had also served with New Zealand Police joining the British High Commission Wing in 2003 and serving in the Auckland City and Counties Manukau police districts before returning to the UK in 2008.

Incident
On the morning of 25 September 2020, a 23-year-old man was arrested for drugs offences and possession of ammunition and taken to the Croydon Custody Centre in a police vehicle. Approaching the suspect to carry-out a temperature check for COVID-19 infection, Ratana was shot in the chest. He was taken to hospital, where he died from gunshot wounds. The suspect was also shot and taken to hospital with critical injuries, which were believed to be self-inflicted. No police firearms were discharged during the incident. A non-police revolver was recovered from the scene, which had been missed in the initial pat-down of the subject. The suspect was in handcuffs during the incident, with his hands behind his back. CCTV captured the incident taking place.

Investigation
The background of the suspect is being investigated by authorities. The suspect had previously been referred to the Prevent programme, an anti-extremism programme developed by the government in an attempt to prevent individuals from joining extremist groups and carrying out terrorist activities. Several crime scenes were established, a cordon was put in place around the Anderson Heights block of flats in Norbury, and a controlled explosion took place in one of the crime scenes in Banstead, Surrey.

Louis de Zoysa, aged 23, was arrested on 13 November 2020 on suspicion of murdering a police officer, when he was considered well enough though still requiring hospital treatment. On 29 June 2021 he was deemed well enough to be formally charged with murder.

See also
 List of British police officers killed in the line of duty

References

2020 in London
21st century in the London Borough of Croydon
Deaths by firearm in London
Deaths by person in London
History of the Metropolitan Police
September 2020 events in the United Kingdom